Sonny Turner (September 24, 1939 – January 13, 2022) was an American singer. Turner hailed from Fairmont, West Virginia, and was best known for replacing Tony Williams as lead singer of The Platters.

Life and career
Prior to his work with The Platters, Turner was the lead singer of a local vocal group called The Metrotones. While performing in a local club in Cleveland as the opening act for Redd Foxx, Turner was approached by local DJ Bill Crane and asked if he would be interested in auditioning for The Platters, as their lead singer as Tony Williams was soon to be leaving the group. Turner was chosen out of 100 hopeful auditioners to replace Williams in late 1959. Turner, whose friend and mentor was Jackie Wilson, breathed new life into The Platters with three hit singles; "I Love You 1000 Times" in 1966, "With This Ring" in 1967 and "Washed Ashore" in 1968. He also re-recorded many of The Platters hits of the 1950s, and it is Turner's vocals that are heard on the soundtracks for films such as The Nutty Professor 2 and Hearts in Atlantis. Turner died from throat cancer in Los Angeles on January 13, 2022, at age 82.

Discography
Albums
Standing Ovation (1974)
Celebrate The New Year At Harvey's Lake Tahoe (1983)
Sings At Lake Tahoe (1983)
Celebrate The New Year '88 At Harvey's, Lake Tahoe (1988)
Singles and EPs
Atlanta / Interstate 65 (1969)
Chicago Woman / Now That You're Gone (1972)
I Want A Guarantee / Now That You're Gone (2016) with Maxine Brown
That's Why (I Love You So)
The Touch
Special Little Woman
I'll Be Around (2020)

References

External links
Sonny Turner (of The Platters) Bio. 
The Platters: A Biography from enotes.com
History of Rock: The Platters

 
 

1939 births
2022 deaths
20th-century African-American singers
21st-century African-American singers
African-American male singers
People from Fairmont, West Virginia
The Platters members
Singers from West Virginia
Deaths from cancer in California
Deaths from throat cancer